This is a list of yearly Atlantic 10 Conference football standings.

Atlantic 10 standings

References

Atlantic 10 Conference
Standings